Stavri Nica (born 8 July 1954) is an Albanian football coach who most recently was manager of KF Devolli in the Albanian First Division.

Managerial career
Nica replaced Elvis Plori as manager of Kastrioti in October 2018. After winning promotion with Devolli to the Albanian First Division in summer 2019, Nica was replaced by Festim Fetollari in November 2019.

References

1954 births
Living people
Sportspeople from Durrës
Albanian football managers
Shkumbini Peqin managers
KF Teuta Durrës managers
Besëlidhja Lezhë managers
KF Laçi managers
KF Apolonia Fier managers
KF Bylis Ballsh managers
KS Burreli managers
KS Kastrioti managers
Kategoria Superiore managers